Sir Arthur Massey  (5 January 1894 – 13 April 1980) was a British medical doctor and author. He was the medical officer of Coventry and author of Epidemiology in Relation to Air Travel (1933). In 1950, he became honorary physician to King George VI.

References 

1894 births
1980 deaths
20th-century British medical doctors